Aviation in Rhode Island is the aeronautical history of that American New England state.

Rhode Island's first aeronautical event was a flight by James Allen in 1856 in a hot air balloon.

Events 
 1896, Edson Fessenden Gallaudet demonstrated a wing warping glider four years before the Wright Brothers. The glider is on display at the Smithsonian Air and Space Museum.
 1916, Providence born pilot, Godfrey DeCourcelles Chevalier participates in the first production catapult launches.

Aircraft Manufacturers 
 Gallaudet Aircraft Company (–1923), Merged with Consolidated Aircraft in 1923.
 Textron, Providence, Rhode Island, (1923–) is a conglomerate that includes Bell Helicopter, E-Z-GO, Cessna Aircraft Company, and Greenlee, among others.

Airports 
T. F. Green Airport has nearly four million passenger movements per year.
List of Airports in Rhode Island

Commercial Service 
New England Airlines provides regional air service.

Organizations 
 Rhode Island Pilots Association - is headquartered in Warwick, Rhode Island.

Government and Military
All flight operations in Rhode Island are conducted within FAA oversight.
The Rhode Island Air National Guard was founded 1915 operating two Curtiss flying boats.
Former Governor Bruce Sundlun served as a Boeing B-17 gunner in World War II. Later becoming a partner in Executive Jet Aviation.
The Rhode Island Airport Corporation operates a Bell 407 Helicopter in support of all state agencies.
The Rhode Island Airport Corporation enforces the provisions of the Uniform Aeronautical Regulatory Act (UAR).

Museums 
Quonset Air Museum 
Rhode Island Aviation Hall of Fame is managing the John F. Kennedy Aircraft Carrier Project.

Gallery

References 

 
Transportation in Rhode Island